The Persian Boy is a 1972 historical novel written by Mary Renault and narrated by Bagoas, a young Persian from an aristocratic family who is captured by his father's enemies, castrated, and sold as a slave to king Darius III, who makes him his favourite. Eventually he becomes the lover and most faithful servant of Alexander the Great, who overthrew Darius and captured the Persian Empire. Bagoas' narration provides both a Persian view of the conquest and an intimate look at the personality of the conqueror. In Renault's view, Alexander's love for Bagoas influenced his desire to unite the Greek and Persian peoples. Renault also posits the notion that Alexander's relentless drive to conquer the world stemmed in part from his troubled relationship with his domineering mother, and his desire to "escape" from her influence by leading his army ever eastward.

The novel is a sequel to Renault's Fire from Heaven (1969). The Persian Boy was a bestseller within the gay community.

Plot introduction
Like much of Renault's fiction, the book, published in 1972, provides a sympathetic portrait of homosexual love. The Persian Boy is notable for its depiction of the tradition of pederasty in ancient Greece, where relationships between adult men and adolescent boys were celebrated. In the novel, Bagoas is 16 years old when he begins his relationship with Alexander (then about 25). Renault depicts the attachment as lasting until Alexander's death, when Bagoas would have been about 23. She explores the tensions in the triangular relationship between Alexander and his two lovers, Hephaistion and Bagoas, and suggests that Alexander went mad with grief over Hephaistion's untimely death.

Allusions/references to actual history
The book describes the major incidents of Alexander's later career, such as his conquest of Bactria, the controversy over Alexander's adoption of Persian customs like proskynesis, his abortive invasion of India, his marriage to Roxana, his crossing of the Gedrosian Desert, the death of Hephaistion and his own final illness and death.

Bagoas was a historical figure, identified by the Roman historian Curtius as "a eunuch exceptional in beauty and in the very flower of boyhood, with whom Darius was intimate and with whom Alexander would later be intimate." Plutarch described Alexander's troops, seeing their leader sitting with the boy, as "clapping their hands and shouting till Alexander put his arms round him and kissed him." From these and a few other fragments, Renault creates an imaginative portrait of a lover and confidant to Alexander. In a review of The Persian Boy, historian Jeanne Reames wrote:

Curtius' history of Alexander presents Bagoas as a vindictive schemer who revenges himself on a Persian noble named Orsines who failed to give him gifts by lying to Alexander about him, eventually succeeding in having him tried and executed. Renault, who accuses Curtius of "muddled sensationalism" in an author's note, points to other sources who suggest that Orxines (as she calls him) was in fact a "murderous" character, and portrays him in the novel as fully deserving his fate. The claim by Curtius that Orsines did not plunder the royal tombs but that these sepulchres were devoid in the first place of rich offerings is an absurd one, as Renault points out, and totally unacceptable in the light of our knowledge of Persian culture.

Renault also points out that the incident in which the army clamoured for Alexander to kiss Bagoas took place very soon after the crossing of the Gedrosian desert, when all those present were survivors of that harrowing incident. Renault argues that Bagoas must have earned the admiration and affection of the army by his courage and fortitude, and his help to others, during the desert crossing.

References

1972 British novels
Novels by Mary Renault
Pederasty in ancient Greece
British LGBT novels
Novels about ephebophilia
Novels set in ancient Persia
Cultural depictions of Alexander the Great
Pantheon Books books
Novels about royalty
Novels set in the 4th century BC
Novels with gay themes
1970s LGBT novels
Longman books